Vinculopsis is a genus of moths of the family Crambidae.

Species
 Vinculopsis epipaschia 
 Vinculopsis scybalistia (Hampson, 1899)

References

 Natural History Museum Lepidoptera genus database

Glaphyriinae
Crambidae genera
Taxa named by Hans Georg Amsel